Middle Juba (Maay: Jubithy Dhahy) is an administrative region (gobol) in southern Somalia. With its capital at Bu'aale, it is located in the autonomous Jubaland region.

Middle Juba is bordered by the Somali regions of Gedo, Bay, Lower Shebelle (Shabellaha Hoose), Lower Juba (Jubbada Hoose), and the Indian Ocean. The region is named after the Jubba River that runs through it.

The region has agricultural production, which is one of the products are Sesame, corn, millet, beans, and large fruits.

There are many tribes living in the region ,sheekhaal   is the majority clan settlement in the region. .

Middle Juba is the only region in Somalia to be fully controlled by Al-Shabaab, a militant Islamic extremist group. As of 2019 Middle Juba has the lowest Human Development Index score in Somalia and the world.

Districts
Middle Juba consists of three districts:

 Bu'aale District
 Jilib District
 Sakow District

Notes

External links
 Administrative map of Middle Juba

Regions of Somalia

Middle Juba